Lasionycta proxima is a moth of the family Noctuidae. It can be found from Spain through Europe, east up to eastern Asia (the Amur area). It is not present in the north-west of the British Isles. In the north, it is found up to Polar Circle. In the south it is found from the Mediterranean Sea up to the Caucasus to Mongolia.

The wingspan is 28–36 mm. The moths fly from June to August. In some locations, there is a second generation in October.

The larvae primarily feed on Alchemilla vulgaris, Taraxacum and Artemisia. But they are also recorded on Rumex crispus and Campanula.

External links

www.lepiforum.de
www.schmetterlinge-deutschlands.de  

Lasionycta
Moths of Europe
Moths of Asia
Taxa named by Jacob Hübner
Moths described in 1809